Ansen Dibell was the pen name used by Nancy Ann Dibble (September 8, 1942 – March 7, 2006), an American science fiction author, who also published books about fiction writing. Born in Staten Island, New York, she received her Master of Fine Arts degree from the Iowa Writers Workshop and earned a doctorate in 19th-century English literature. She taught literature and creative writing at several colleges and universities until 1980, when she became a freelance editor and author. From 1983 she worked as editor at Writer's Digest Books.

She published a number of stories and poems in The Magazine of Fantasy and Science Fiction and received two awards for her poetry. Her novels sublimate events in her life into fiction.

Works

The King of Kantmorie
 Pursuit of the Screamer, DAW Books, June 1978, 
 De laatste koning, Dutch edition (M=SF), 
 Circle, Crescent, Star, DAW Books, February 1981, 
 Ashai Rey, Dutch edition (M=SF), 
 Summerfair, DAW Books, July 1982, 
 Zomermarkt, Dutch edition (M=SF)
 Tidestorm Limit, 1983, (published in Dutch and French translations only)
 Stormvloedgrens, Dutch edition (M=SF)
 Aux confins de l'ouragan, French edition
 The Sun of Return, 1985 (published in Dutch and French translations only)
 Gift van de Shai, Dutch edition (M=SF)
 Le soleil du grand retour, French edition

Non-fiction
 Plot: Elements of Fiction Writing, Writer's Digest Books, August 1988, 
 Paperback edition: Writer's Digest Books, August 1999, 
 Word Processing Secrets for Writers (with Michael A. Banks), Writer's Digest Books, March 1989, 
 How to Write a Million: The Complete Guide to Becoming a Successful Author (with Orson Scott Card, Lewis Turco, and Michael Ridpath), Constable Robinson, January 1995,

External links
 Dani Zweig's review of Dibell's work
 Review of Circle, Crescent, Star Broken link
 Review of Summerfair Broken link
 

1942 births
2006 deaths
20th-century American novelists
20th-century American women writers
American science fiction writers
American women novelists
Women science fiction and fantasy writers
21st-century American women